Claudio Gatti is an Italian investigative journalist, based in New York City.

Career
Claudio Gatti is a special correspondent for Il Sole 24 Ore and writes for The New York Times, the International Herald Tribune and The Philadelphia Inquirer. He has written for Italian and foreign newspapers, and was a correspondent for L'Europeo, Deputy Director of The World and director of Italy Daily supplement.

In the United States, Gatti is most well known for his investigative reporting on the identity of novelist Elena Ferrante. Published in October 2016 in the New York Review of Books, and simultaneously in the Italian, German, and French press, Gatti's article quickly set off a firestorm of criticism.

Awards
 Saint-Vincent journalism prize, 2003
 Premiolino journalism prize, 2005

References

Italian male journalists
1955 births
Living people
Journalists from Rome